Jumong (lit. "The Book of the Three Hans: The Chapter of Jumong") is a South Korean historical series that aired on MBC from 2006 to 2007 as the network's 45th anniversary special. Originally scheduled for 60 episodes, MBC extended it to 81 because of its popularity.

The series examines the life of Jumong, founder of the kingdom of Goguryeo. The fantastic elements surrounding the original Jumong legend (such as those concerning his birth) have been replaced with events more grounded in reality. Jumong is considered part of the Korean Wave (Hallyu), with viewer ratings in Iran exceeding 80 percent.

Plot
Following the conquest of Gojoseon by Han China in 108 BCE, the surviving tribes and city-states of Manchuria and the northern Korean Peninsula are harshly subjugated as tributaries to the Han, who are portrayed as ruling with an iron fist from the Four Commanderies. Haemosu, the leader of the local resistance in the form of the Damul Army, covertly teams up with Prince Geumwa of Buyeo to defend and rescue Gojoseon refugees throughout the land. After being injured in a battle, Haemosu is rescued by Lady Yuhwa of the Habaek tribe (to whom Geumwa has taken a fancy), and they fall in love. Haemosu is subsequently ambushed and captured by Han forces (and after falling off a cliff is presumed dead by the outside world), and Lady Yuhwa is forced to seek shelter in Buyeo, where she becomes Geumwa's concubine and gives birth to a son, Jumong. They maintain that Geumwa is Jumong's father, when in fact Haemosu is his father.

Twenty years later, the young Jumong is a weak and cowardly prince overshadowed and scorned by his elder "half-brothers" Daeso and Youngpo, who are vying for inheritance of the Buyeo throne from their father (the now-King Geumwa). Because they believe Jumong is Geumwa's son, they assume that he has a justifiable claim to the throne, and their mother's hatred of Lady Yuhwa reinforces a feud between the half-brothers who aren't really brothers at all. This culminates in an assassination attempt by his brothers, setting in motion a sequence of events that leads to Jumong leaving the palace and, by a twist of fate, encounters his father, the now-elderly and blind Haemosu. Jumong becomes skilled in combat under Haemosu's covert tutelage, but is unaware of their father-son relationship. At the same time, Jumong forms a close relationship with Lady Soseono of the Gyeru trading clan of Jolbon. Following Haemosu's assassination by Daeso and Youngpo, Jumong learns the truth and vows to avenge his father and drive out the Han. He returns to Geumwa and leads the Buyeo army in a campaign against the Lintun and Zhenfan Commanderies, but is reported missing in action and presumed dead following an injury in battle. Subsequently, Daeso seizes power in Buyeo by colluding with Xuantu Commandery and forces Soseono to be his wife. In desperation, Soseono weds her trading partner Wootae (not knowing Jumong is still alive). Jumong, however, is rescued by the Hanbaek tribe and nursed back to health by Lady Yesoya, whom he weds. They return to Buyeo and Jumong feigns servitude to Daeso, thereby earning his trust. With Daeso's guard down, Jumong and his men manage to intercept and lead a large group of Gojoseon refugees into the wilds of Mount Bongye, where they establish a fortress and re-form the Damul Army, against Daeso's wishes, who holds Lady Yuhwa and a pregnant Yesoya hostage in the palace. After a solar eclipse, Geumwa regains the power with the help of the Prime Minister. He tries to convince Jumong to come back to palace and disband the Damul Army as part of the conditions given by the Prime minister in exchange for his reinstatement. Jumong refuses the offer and the Prime Minister tries to eliminate him and his men.

Over the next three years, the Damul Army grows and begins uniting various local tribes, to the discomfort of Buyeo and Han. Following Wootae's death in battle, Jumong and Soseono form an alliance and unite the five clans of Jolbon and the Damul Army into a single powerful entity, which succeeds in conquering the Xuantu Commandery and establishing the Kingdom of Goguryeo. When Yesoya and Yuri are reported missing from Buyeo (and presumed dead), a grieving Jumong weds Soseono and they become King and Queen of the new nation.

After ruling Goguryeo for fifteen years, Jumong succeeds in reuniting with Yesoya and Yuri (who had been living in exile after escaping from the palace). Following Geumwa's assassination by Han mercenaries, the newly-crowned King Daeso forms an alliance with Jumong, and the combined armies of Goguryeo and Buyeo succeed in conquering Liaodong Commandery with utter annihilation of the Han army in Manchuria. With Jumong's lifelong mission finally complete and in order to prevent internal strife due to Yuri's return, Soseono departs from Goguryeo and heads south with the pro-Jolbon faction and her teenage sons Biryu and Onjo, who subsequently becomes the founder of the Kingdom of Baekje on the Korean Peninsula. Buyeo eventually collapses following the battlefield death of Daeso at the hands of Jumong's grandson Muhyul. Jumong continues battling against Han China to consolidate his realm, and dies at the age of 40 after passing the crown of Goguryeo to Yuri.

Cast
Song Il-kook as Jumong
Han Hye-jin as Soseono
Kim Seung-soo as Prince Daeso
Jun Kwang-ryul as King Geumwa
Oh Yeon-soo as Lady Yuhwa
Kyeon Mi-ri as Queen Wonhu
Song Ji-hyo as Ye So-ya
Park Tam-hee as Yang Seo-ran
Ahn Yong-joon as Yuri
Jung Yoon-seok as young Yuri
Kim Byung-ki as Yeon Ta-bal
Jin Hee-kyung as High Priestess Yeo Mi-eul
Lee Jae-yong as Prime Minister Bu Deuk-bul
Huh Joon-ho as Hae Mosu 
Won Ki-joon as Prince Youngpo
Bae Soo-bin as Sa-yong
Kang Eun-tak as Chan-soo
Im So-yeong as Bu-young 
Yoon Dong-hwan as Yang-jung
Oh Uk-chul as Lord Hwang
Yeo Ho-min as Oh-i
Ahn Jeong-hoon as Ma-ri
Im Dae-ho as Hyeop-bo 
Lee Kye-in as Mo Pal-mo
Seo Beom-sik as Moo-gol
Kim Min-chan as Mook-geo
Cha Kwang-soo as Jae-sa
Park Kyung-hwan as Bu Beon-no 
Park Nam-hyeon as Na-ru
Jeong Ho-bin as Wutae
Lee Jae-suk as Biryu
Kim Seok as Onjo
Lee Won-jae as Do-chi
Kwon Yong-woon as Moo-song
Oh Ji-young as Jong-go
Jo Myung-jin as Mu-duk
Lee Seung-ah as Chun-rang
Han Hee-jin as In-rang
Kim Nan-hee as Ji-rang
Min Ji-young as courtesan
Kim Ho-young as Ma-ga
Kim Won-suk as Song-joo
Son Ho-kyoon as Heuk-chi
No Hee-ji as So-ryeong
Jeong Han-heon as Kye-pil
Jang Hyo-jin as Baek Sun-in
Hwang Bum-sik as Jin-yong
Park Jong-kwan as Song-yang
Bae Do-hwan as Tae Ma-jin
Baek Na-young as Yeon Chae-ryeong
Kim Jin-ho as Yang-tak
Ha Yong-jin as Dong-sun
Yoon Seo-hyun as Han-dang
Lee Hwan as Sang-chun
Han Kyung-sun as court lady
Yoo Hee-jung as court lady
Song Gui-hun as Bul-gae
Kwon Eun-ha as Mauryeong
Kang Moon-hee as Hyun-moo
Dan So-young as Yoo-sung
Jeon Ha-eun as Byeo Ri-ha
Lee Sung as Hae Byeol-chan
Hong Soon-chang as Jin Joong-moon
Lee Chang-hwan as head of a tribe
Park Geun-hyung as King Hae Buru
Shin Joon-young as Bae-mang
Han In-su as head of a tribe
Kim Yong-hee as Sul-tak
Oh Seung-yun as Chun-doong
Son Sun-geun as Man-ho
Lee Won-yong as fortune-teller
Moon Hee-won as former Governor-general
Yun Yong-hyeon as Boo Wiyeom
Jang Hee-woong as Ha Hoo-chun
Samuel Kang as warrior

Production

Jumong was filmed on location at Yongin Daejanggeum Park in Cheoin District, Yongin, Gyeonggi Province, where other period dramas (such as Dong Yi, Moon Embracing the Sun and Queen Seondeok) were also filmed.

Ratings
Jumong received the highest viewership ratings of all the Korean dramas that aired in 2006.

Awards and nominations

International broadcast
Broadcast rights for Jumong were sold to Iran (Channel 3), Turkey, Romania (TVR1), Kazakhstan, Georgia (Imedi TV), Armenia, Japan (Fuji TV), Mongolia, Taiwan, Hong Kong, Vietnam (VTV1), Singapore (Mediacorp Channel U), Indonesia, Thailand (Channel 3), Malaysia, Brunei, Philippines (GMA Network), Fiji (Fiji One), Iraqi Kurdistan, Afghanistan, Uzbekistan, Cambodia (Cambodian Television Network), United States (AZN Television), Myanmar (Myawaddy TV & MRTV-4), and Sri Lanka (Sri Lanka Rupavahini Corporation).

According to Reuters the most popular episodes of Jumong attracted over 90% of Iranian audience (compared to 40% in South Korea), propelling its lead actor Song Il-gook to superstar status in Iran.

Hong Kong broadcast controversy
Asia Television bought the Hong Kong broadcast rights; however, controversy surrounding its translation escalated debate about ATV's editorial independence in news and drama. The controversy primarily surrounded the cutting of certain segments, the alternative translation of place names and the alternative of a character's occupation. The changing of the word "nation" (in reference to Goguryeo) to "tribe" and the translation of the Han Dynasty as the "heavenly dynasty" has generated controversy about the station's editorial independence. This is related to controversies involving the governments of China and South Korea over the version of history of Goguryeo.

References

External links

Jumong official MBC website 
Jumong at MBC Global Media

MBC TV television dramas
2006 South Korean television series debuts
2007 South Korean television series endings
Korean-language television shows
Television series set in Goguryeo
South Korean historical television series
South Korean action television series
Television series by Chorokbaem Media
Television shows written by Choi Wan-kyu
Censorship in Hong Kong
Television controversies in China